Košarkaški klub Donji Vakuf, commonly referred to as Promo Donji Vakuf or Promo DV due to sponsorship reasons, is a men's professional basketball club based in Donji Vakuf, Central Bosnia Canton, Bosnia and Herzegovina. They are currently competing in the Bosnia and Herzegovina Championship.

History
The club was founded in 1979 as KK Radnik. In 1996, following the end of the Bosnian War, the club was renamed to KK Donji Vakuf. Since 2011, the club bears the name KK Promo Donji Vakuf due to sponsorship reasons.

The club won the 2nd-tier A1 League in the 2018–19 season and got promoted to Bosnia and Herzegovina Championship for the 2019–20 season.

Sponsorship naming
The club has had several denominations through the years due to its sponsorship:
 Donji Vakuf Komar Gips (2009–2011)
 Promo Donji Vakuf (2011–present)

Home arena
The club plays its home games at the Donji Vakuf Sports Hall. The hall is located in Donji Vakuf, Central Bosnia Canton, and was built in 2016. It has a seating capacity of 800 seats.

Players

Head coaches 

  Suad Hodžić (–2017)
  Ahmet Pašalić (2017–2018)
  Bakir Srna (2018–2019)
  Kenan Jugo (2019)
  Hamid Frljak (2019–2020)
  Slobodan Ninić (2020–present)

Trophies and awards
Bosnian A1 League (2nd-tier)
Winners (1): 2018–19

References

External links
 Profile at eurobasket.com
 Profile at realgm.com

Donji Vakuf
Donji Vakuf
Donji Vakuf
Donji Vakuf